The Little Devil Track River is a  stream in northeastern Minnesota, the United States. It is a tributary of the Devil Track River and flows west to east, north of the city of Grand Marais.

See also
List of rivers of Minnesota

References

Minnesota Watersheds
USGS Hydrologic Unit Map - State of Minnesota (1974)

Rivers of Minnesota
Rivers of Cook County, Minnesota